Ribosomal protein S6 (rpS6 or eS6) is a component of the 40S ribosomal subunit and is therefore involved in translation.  Mouse model studies have shown that phosphorylation of eS6 is involved in the regulation of cell size, cell proliferation, and glucose homeostasis.

Studies show that the p70 ribosomal protein S6 kinases (S6K1 and S6K2) and p90 ribosomal protein S6 kinases (RSK) both phosphorylate eS6 and that S6K1 and S6K2 predominate this function.

Pathways leading to the induction of human eS6 phosphorylation have been found to enhance IL-8 protein synthesis. This mechanism is dependent on A/U-rich proximal sequences (APS) found in the 3'UTR of IL-8 immediately after the stop codon.

References

External links 
 
 

Ribosomal proteins